Anisha may refer to

 Anisha Ambrose, Indian film actress and model
 Anisha Basheel (born 1997), Malawian professional boxer 
 Anisha Nagarajan (born 1983), American actress and singer
 Anisha Nicole (born 1985), American singer
 Anisha Vekemans (born 1991), Belgian professional racing cyclist

See also
 Anish, a given name

feminine  given names